Simon Stephens (born 6 February 1971) is an English playwright and Professor of Scriptwriting at Manchester Metropolitan University. Having taught on the Young Writers' Programme at the Royal Court Theatre for many years, he is now an Artistic Associate at the Lyric Hammersmith. He is the inaugural Associate Playwright of Steep Theatre Company, Chicago, where four of his plays, Harper Regan, Motortown, Wastwater, and Birdland had their U.S. premieres. His writing is widely performed throughout Europe and, along with Dennis Kelly and Martin Crimp, he is one of the most performed English-language writers in Germany.

Life

Originally from Stockport, Greater Manchester, Stephens graduated from the University of York with a degree in History. After university, he lived in Edinburgh for several years, where he met his future wife Polly, before later completing a PGCE at the Institute of Education. He worked as a teacher for a few years, before quitting to become a professional playwright. In 2017, Simon Stephens was appointed to a Professorship at the Manchester School of Writing, at Manchester Metropolitan University.

He was a member of Scottish art punk band Country Teasers.

Stephens lives in London with his wife and three children. He has three cats, a dog, a snake & a capybara as pets. In 2016, Stephens published A Working Diary, an account of his activities throughout 2014.

Plays
 Morning Sun (2021). Manhattan Theatre Club production premiered in October 2021 at New York City Center Stage I directed by Lila Neugebauer, with Blair Brown, Edie Falco, and Marin Ireland.
 Blindness (2020). Premiered at Donmar Warehouse, directed by Walter Meierjohann. Adaptation of José Saramago's novel of the same name.
 Fortune (2020). Premiered at Tokyo Metropolitan Theatre, directed by Sean Holmes
Rage (2018) premiered at the Royal Welsh College of Music & Drama, directed by Elle While Revival cast premiere at the University of Wales Trinity Saint David (2020)
 Obsession (2017). (English translation of Jan Peter Gerrits' play) Premiered at the Barbican Centre, directed by Ivo Van Hove
 The Seagull (2017). Premiered at the Lyric Hammersmith, directed by Sean Holmes
 Fatherland (2017). Co-created with Frantic Assembly's Scott Graham and Karl Hyde for the Manchester International Festival at the Royal Exchange.
The Threepenny Opera (2016) premiered at the National Theatre, directed by Rufus Norris, a new adaptation of Bertolt Brecht's book and lyrics (music by Kurt Weill)
Heisenberg (2015) premiered Off-Broadway at the New York City Center-Stage II, directed by Mark Brokaw
Song From Far Away (2015) premiered at the Young Vic, directed by Ivo van Hove
The Cherry Orchard (2014) premiering at the Young Vic, directed by Katie Mitchell
Carmen Disruption (2014) premiering at Deutsches Schauspielhaus, directed by Sebastian Nübling
Blindsided (2014) premiered at the Royal Exchange Theatre, directed by Sarah Frankcom
Birdland (2014) premiered at the Royal Court Theatre, directed by Carrie Cracknell
London (2012) incorporating Sea Wall and T5 premiered at Salisbury Playhouse, directed by George Perrin
Morning (2012) premiered at the Traverse Theatre, directed by Sean Holmes
The Curious Incident of the Dog in the Night-Time (2012) premiered at the National Theatre, directed by Marianne Elliott, adapted from the Mark Haddon novel of the same name
A Doll's House (2012) premiered at the Young Vic, directed by Carrie Cracknell American premiere at Brooklyn Academy of Music (2014)
 Three Kingdoms (2011) premiered at Theatre NO99 in Tallinn, Estonia, directed by Sebastian Nübling, English premiere at the Lyric Hammersmith (2012) | German premiere at the Munich Kammerspiele (2011)
 I Am the Wind (2011) translation of the Jon Fosse play premiered at the Young Vic, directed by Patrice Chéreau
Wastwater (2011) premiered at the Royal Court Theatre, directed by Katie Mitchell
The Trial of Ubu (2010) premiered at the Toneelgroep in Amsterdam, (2012) English premiere at the Hampstead Theatre, directed by Katie Mitchell
T5 (2010) premiered at DryWrite at the Roundhouse, directed by Vicky Jones, and further developed at the Traverse Theatre as part of Traverse Live!, directed by Dominic Hill
A Thousand Stars Explode in the Sky (2010) written with David Eldridge and Robert Holman premiered at the Lyric Hammersmith, directed by Sean Holmes
Marine Parade (2010) with music by Mark Eitzel premiered at the Brighton Festival directed by Jo McInnes
Punk Rock (2009) premiered at the Royal Exchange Theatre, directed by Sarah Frankcom
Canopy of Stars (2008) premiered at the Tricycle Theatre as part of the 'Great Game' series
Sea Wall (2008) premiered in the Broken Space Season at Bush Theatre, directed by George Perrin
Pornography (2007) premiered at the Traverse Theatre directed by Sean Holmes
Harper Regan (2007) premiered at the National Theatre, directed by Marianne Elliott
Motortown (2006) premiered at the Royal Court Theatre, directed by Ramin Gray
On the Shore of the Wide World (2005) premiered at the Royal Exchange Theatre, directed by Sarah Frankcom
Country Music (2004) premiered at the Royal Court Theatre, directed by Gordon Anderson
Christmas (2004) premiered at the Bush Theatre, directed by Joanne McInnes
One Minute (2003) premiered at the ATC, directed by Gordon Anderson
Port (2002) premiered at the Royal Exchange, directed by Marianne Elliott
Herons (2001) premiered at the Royal Court Theatre, directed by Simon Usher
Bluebird (1998) premiered at the Royal Court Theatre, directed by Gordon Anderson
Bring Me Sunshine (1997) premiered at the Edinburgh Fringe Festival, directed by Heather Davies

Awards
The Curious Incident of the Dog in the Night-Time won the Olivier Award for Best New Play 2013 and the 2015 Tony Award for Best Play
Punk Rock was nominated at the TMA Awards for Best New Play in 2010, and was also nominated for the Evening Standard Award for Best New Play in 2010
Pornography won the Critics' Awards for Theatre in Scotland for Best New Play in 2008-09
On the Shore of The Wide World won the Olivier Award for Best New Play in 2006
One Minute won at the Tron Theatre Awards as Best New Play in 2003
Port won the Pearson Award for Best New Play in 2001

References

External links
 Simon Stephens at Doollee

 Official website of the Sea Wall movie, performed by Andrew Scott

1971 births
Living people
People from Stockport
Alumni of the University of York
English male dramatists and playwrights
20th-century English dramatists and playwrights
20th-century English male writers
21st-century English dramatists and playwrights
21st-century English male writers
English diarists